Haralabos Papadias (Χαράλαμπος Παπαδιάς; born 24 January 1975) is a retired Greek sprinter who specialized in the 100 metres.

He won the gold medal in 60 metres at the 1997 World Indoor Championships, in a time of 6.50 seconds (NR). He also finished fourth at the 1996 European Indoor Championships, won the bronze medal at the 1998 European Championships, and finished sixth at the 1998 IAAF World Cup. He also competed at the 1997 World Championships without reaching the final.

His personal best time was 10.15 seconds, achieved at the 1998 IAAF World Cup in Johannesburg. This ranks him fourth among Greek 100 metres sprinters, behind Angelos Pavlakakis, Aristotelis Gavelas and Christoforos Choidis.

Honours

References 

 
 Profile at Sporting Heroes

1975 births
Living people
Greek male sprinters
Olympic athletes of Greece
Athletes (track and field) at the 1996 Summer Olympics
World Athletics Indoor Championships winners
European Athletics Championships medalists
Athletes from Athens
20th-century Greek people